Malcolm "Papa Mali" Welbourne (born May 6, 1957) is an American record producer, guitarist, singer, and songwriter who grew up in Shreveport, Louisiana, United States,  and lives in New Orleans, Louisiana, United States.

His debut recording Thunder Chicken, produced by Dan Prothero, has been referred to as "one of the few truly wild and unruly records to come from the rock & roll tradition in the 21st century".

Biography
While still in grade school, he was conning his cousin to take him into the French Quarter so he could buy every element of Brian Jones's outfit from the front cover of The Rolling Stones High Tides & Green Grass.

He had taken up the guitar at age four, and was learning to play rock and blues by the time he was eleven. At the age of twelve he witnessed The Meters performing on the back of a flatbed truck in New Orleans on Mardi Gras Day. This would influence the young musician. John Campbell took him under his wing when Welbourne was 14, and around that time he started taking the blues seriously. By the time he was 17, he had left home and was hitch hiking around the south, playing guitar on the streets for passing change, playing in juke joints, forming short-lived bands or backing up blues and soul singers.

A trip to Jamaica in 1977 exposed him to reggae music, and a few years later he teamed up with Michael E. Johnson and formed The Killer Bees in 1980. They continued to play for many years, eventually becoming one of the first American bands to perform at Reggae Sunsplash in Montego Bay, Jamaica in 1988. Earlier, while on tour with Burning Spear aka Winston Rodney and his band, he received the nickname, Papa Mali from the reggae pioneers. By the time the Killer Bees disbanded, Papa Mali went solo.

Upon the release of his debut album Thunder Chicken he remarked that for the first time in his adult life, he was finally able to reflect warmly on the years growing up in Shreveport. In 2007, he released the follow-up, Do Your Thing, also on the Fog City imprint and produced by Dan Prothero. The album included work by Big Chief Monk Boudreaux and the Golden Eagles Mardi Gras Indians, Kirk Joseph, and Henry Butler. By now, Papa Mali was performing at many of the top festivals in the U.S. and abroad.

On New Year's Eve of 2008/2009 Papa Mali, Matt Hubbard and former Neville Brothers bassist James "Hutch" Hutchinson performed with Grateful Dead drummer Bill Kreutzmann in concert at the Pauela Cannery in Haiku-Pauwela, Hawaii.

In 2009 he formed a new band, 7 Walkers along with Grateful Dead drummer Bill Kreutzmann,  The Meters bassist George Porter Jr. (initially with bassist Reed Mathis) and multi-instrumentalist, Matt Hubbard. Their self-titled debut was released on November 2, 2010 on Response Records. The songs were co-written by Papa Mali and Robert Hunter. One of these songs, "King Cotton Blues", featured a duet by Papa Mali and Willie Nelson. The record was recorded in Austin, and produced by Papa Mali.

Papa Mali's latest album is Music is Love, released in 2015 is produced by veteran roots producer John Chelew on the 429 Records label. Music is Love features drummer Johnny Vidacovich, Bassist Casandra Faulconer and features Mike Dillon and Dave Easley on backing vocals.

Papa Mali performed at SXSW 2015 on Friday, March 20 at 4:30 and Saturday, March 21 at 4:00.

Selected discography
 The Killer Bees "Scratch The Surface" 1985 - Beehive Records 
 Killer Bees "Groovin'" (1987) - Jungle Records 
 Michael E. Johnson and The Killer Bees "Live in Berlin" (1988) - Rykodisc
 The Killer Bees "All Abuzz" (1997) - Mozelle
 Papa Mali and the Instigators Thunder Chicken (2000) – Fog City Records
 Imperial Golden Crown Harmonizers "Imperial Golden Crown Harmonizers" (2001) - Catamount
 Papa Mali Do Your Thing (2007) – Fog City Records
 Malcom Welbourne, slide guitar on Omar & the Howlers "Boogie Man" (2004) - Ruf Records
 Papa Mali "Music Is Love" (2015) - 429 Records

As producer
 Ruthie Foster, The Phenomenal Ruthie Foster (2007) Blue Corn
 The Greyhounds, "LIBERTY" (2005) Luther
 Lavelle White, "INTO THE MYSTIC" (2004) Antone’s
 Omar & the Howlers, "BIG DELTA" Blind Pig (2002) Blind Pig
 Omar & the Howlers, "THE SCREAMING CAT" (2000) Provogue

With 7 Walkers
 7 Walkers (2010) Response Records

References

External links
 Official Website
 Fog City Records presents: Papa Mali
 Papa Mali collection at the Internet Archive's live music archive

1957 births
Living people
American male singers
American funk guitarists
American male guitarists
American funk singers
American blues guitarists
American blues singers
Singers from Louisiana
Songwriters from Louisiana
Slide guitarists
Guitarists from Louisiana
7 Walkers members
20th-century American guitarists
20th-century American male musicians
American male songwriters